Joy Cushman is an American swimmer.

Biography
Cushman was born in Houston, Texas.

Between 1958 and 1963, Cushman was the chair of AAU Synchronized Swimming and, between 1956 and 1975, she was a member of the United States Olympic Committee Board of Directors.

In 2018, Cushman was inducted into the International Swimming Hall of Fame.

Medals and recognition
 FINA Silver Pin
 Lillian MacKellar Distinguished Service Award
 Milby Hall of Fame

References

American swimmers
People from Houston
United States Olympic Committee